A list of films produced in the Soviet Union in 1971 (see 1971 in film).

1971

External links
 Soviet films of 1971 at the Internet Movie Database

1971
Soviet
Films